Alina Ilnazovna Zagitova (born 18 May 2002) is a Russian figure skater. She is the 2018 Olympic champion, the 2019 World champion, the 2018 European champion, 2017–18 Grand Prix Final champion, and the 2018 Russian national champion. Zagitova also won a silver medal in the team event at the 2018 Winter Olympics, representing the Olympic Athletes from Russia team.

Zagitova is the only Russian female figure skater who has won gold at the Olympic Games, World Figure Skating Championships, European Figure Skating Championships and Grand Prix of Figure Skating Final. She is the first Muslim athlete to win an Olympic figure skating gold medal, a world title and the Super Slam. She is the youngest and second ladies' singles skater, after Yuna Kim, to win gold in all major ISU championship titles including the Junior Grand Prix Series and Final, World Junior Championships, Grand Prix Series and Final, European Championships, World Championships, and Winter Olympic Games. Earlier in her career, she won gold at the 2017 World Junior Championships and at the 2016–17 Junior Grand Prix Final. At the 2016–17 Junior Grand Prix Final, she became the first junior lady to achieve a total score above the 200 mark. Zagitova has broken the world record once under the old system and four times under the new system.

Career

Early years 
Zagitova had her first formal skating lessons as a four-year-old with Damira Pichugina in Almetyevsk, Tatarstan, where her father was a hockey coach for the Neftyanik club. After the family moved back to Izhevsk in 2008, she started training with coach Natalia Antipina. In 2015, she moved to Moscow to be coached by Eteri Tutberidze and Sergei Dudakov.

Zagitova finished 9th at the 2016 Russian Junior Championships after placing 12th in the short program and 8th in the free skate.

2016–17 season: World Junior Champion

Zagitova's international debut came in late August 2016 at a 2016–17 ISU Junior Grand Prix (JGP) competition in Saint-Gervais-les-Bains, France; ranked first in both segments, she won the gold medal ahead of Kaori Sakamoto. Her total score at the event, 194.37 points, was the second highest ever achieved by a ladies' single skater on the junior level, behind only Polina Tsurskaya. Zagitova took the bronze medal at her JGP event in Slovenia, behind Japanese skaters Rika Kihira and Marin Honda. The results qualified her to the 2016–17 JGP Final, held in December in Marseille.

In France, Zagitova ranked first in both segments and scored new junior ladies' records in all categories. She was awarded the gold medal with a total of 207.43 points, 13 points above her teammate and silver medalist Anastasiia Gubanova (194.07). She became the first junior lady skater in history to have a total score above the 200 mark.

Competing on the senior level in late December, Zagitova ranked third in the short and second in the free at the 2017 Russian Championships, winning the silver medal behind her training partner, Evgenia Medvedeva. In February 2017, Zagitova won the gold medal at the European Youth Olympic Festival in Turkey.

At the 2017 World Junior Championships in Taipei, Zagitova placed first after the short program with 70.58 points. In the free program, she also placed first and won gold medal. She set two new world record of 138.02 points for junior ladies' free skating, and 208.60 points for combined total.

2017–18 season: Olympic Champion and world record holder

Zagitova began the 2017–18 season with a win at the CS Lombardia Trophy, after placing third in the short but first in the free, with a total score of 218.46. For the 2017–18 Grand Prix Season, Zagitova was assigned to two events, Cup of China and Internationaux de France. At China, she was fourth after the short program, but rallied to win the free skate, and won the gold medal overall with a total competition score of 213.88. At the Internationaux de France, Zagitova placed fifth in the short program after a fall on her triple lutz and several under-rotation deductions. However, she placed first in the free skate with a new personal best score of 151.34 and took gold. Her results allowed her to qualify for the 2017–18 Grand Prix Final.

At the Grand Prix Final, Zagitova scored a personal best in the short program, 76.27, and was in second place behind Kaetlyn Osmond heading into the free skate. Zagitova placed first in the free skate, despite two minor mistakes, and received a personal best overall competition score of 223.30, becoming the 2017–18 Grand Prix Final champion. Later that month, she won the Russian National title, in the absence of her teammate Evgenia Medvedeva, earning first in both segments for a total score of 233.59 points.

At the 2018 Europeans in Moscow, Zagitova finished first, winning over Medvedeva who had remained unbeaten for more than two years. The following day, 21 January, Zagitova was named to the Russian Olympic team (together with Medvedeva and Maria Sotskova).

At the Olympics team event, the 10 points Zagitova earned for the first place in the ladies' free skating helped Olympic Athletes from Russia to a silver medal in the competition. She scored 158.08, setting a new personal best and breaking the record for the highest-ever technical score in ladies' team figure skating.

In the ladies' individual event, Zagitova skated a clean short program and posted a world record score of 82.92, beating the previous record of 81.61 that Medvedeva had posted earlier that evening. Her total score of 239.57 was a new personal best. Zagitova won the gold medal in the event at the age of 15 years and 281 days, to become one of the youngest figure skating Olympic champions.

During the 2018 Olympics, The New York Times reported that Zagitova had performed the most technically difficult program in the history of ladies' Olympic gold medalists by performing at a base value of 46.1, approximately 25% higher than that of Kristi Yamaguchi and Tara Lipinski in the 1990s, and more than double that of Dorothy Hamill during the Olympics in the 1970s. Previously, in 1998, Lipinski had become the first woman to include a triple loop–triple loop combination in her Olympic program. By comparison, Zagitova completed the harder triple lutz–triple loop combination at the 2018 Olympics.

In the free skating at the 2018 Olympics, Zagitova was the only competitor to perform all of her (eleven) jumps in the second half of the program. This capitalized on the ISU scoring system, which awards a 10% bonus to the base value of jumps performed on "tired legs". Her combination jump of triple lutz–triple loop was technically more difficult and higher scoring than those performed by her competitors irrespective of where it appeared in the program. Some observers criticized this program construction, believing that it led to an unbalanced program, pointing out that the ISU had instituted a 10% bonus in the second half to encourage skaters to spread out their jumps. To address this problem, the ISU introduced a rule after the 2017–18 season—dubbed by skating enthusiasts "the Zagitova rule"—stating that a skater must perform jumps in both halves of a program, only allowing three jumping passes to receive the 10% bonus.

Shortly after the competition, the Russian president Vladimir Putin congratulated Zagitova on her victory in a note published on the official Kremlin website.

Zagitova competed at the 2018 World Championships in Milan. In the short program, she placed second to Carolina Kostner, but fell three times in the free skate, where she placed seventh. She finished fifth overall, which was her only loss in the 2017–18 season.

2018–19 season: World Champion
The ISU records were reset at the start of the 2018–19 season, with all world records from before 1 July 2018 becoming historic records. Zagitova began the season at the 2018 CS Nebelhorn Trophy in Oberstdorf, Germany. She finished in first place after both the short program and free skate events, winning the gold with a total of 238.43 points. Since the ISU records had been reset, her free skate and combined scores from this event became new world records and remained as such throughout the entire season. Rika Kihira of Japan was the holder of the short program record.

In early November, Zagitova competed at her first Grand Prix event of the season, the 2018 Grand Prix of Helsinki. She was ranked first in both the short program and the free skate, winning the gold medal by a margin of about 18 points over the silver medalist, who was her teammate Stanislava Konstantinova. In mid-November, she competed at her second Grand Prix event of the season, the 2018 Rostelecom Cup. She was again ranked first in both programs and won the gold medal by a margin of about 25 points over the silver medalist, her teammate Sofia Samodurova.

With two gold medals, she qualified for the 2018–19 Grand Prix Final, which was expected to be a tight competition between Zagitova and Rika Kihira, who had earlier won the Ondrej Nepela Trophy after Zagitova had withdrawn due to visa issues. Zagitova won the silver medal, behind Kihira, with both skaters making errors in the free skate – Zagitova "popped" an attempted triple toe loop in her opening combination. Speaking afterwards, she said, "you always want to be first, but this is not going to happen every time."

At the 2019 Russian Championships, Zagitova comfortably placed first in the short program, saying she was "satisfied with [her] short program today, but there is still room to grow." She did not have a successful free skate, falling twice and struggling during her choreographic sequence. She placed twelfth in the free skate, and fifth overall; however, she was still granted an automatic place on the Russian team for the European Championships because the top three skaters were junior competitors and thus ineligible for the team; Zagitova was second out of the senior competitors despite finishing in fifth place. She did not speak to the media after the competition. As well as finishing behind junior competitors, Zagitova also lost against a senior eligible skater for the first time in domestic competition, placing below Konstantinova.

At the 2019 European Championships, Zagitova placed first in the short program despite an under-rotation on her triple loop. She fared poorly in the free skate, falling once and under-rotating or downgrading the majority of her jumping passes, which led to her placing fourth in the free skate, and second overall, behind Samodurova and less than four points ahead of Finnish skater Viveca Lindfors. Speaking afterwards, she said, "It's good I'm in the top three and the silver medal is also good – it could have been worse, so I’m happy with silver, but I wanted to do better for me personally."

Following the European Championships, Zagitova was chosen to represent Russia at the 2019 World Championships in Saitama, Japan, alongside Samodurova and former training mate Evgenia Medvedeva. Zagitova delivered a clean skate in the short program, obtaining high GOEs on the jumping elements including her signature triple Lutz–triple loop combination. She received a season's best score of 82.08, which was more than five points ahead of Kaori Sakamoto, who placed second, and more than eleven points ahead of Rika Kihira, who had been anticipated to be Zagitova's closest rival for the gold medal. In the press conference afterwards, she remarked, "Regarding today's program, I'm satisfied." Two days later, she performed a clean free program for the first time in competition since the Nebelhorn Trophy in September 2018, receiving a score of 155.42, the highest of the day. With a combined score of 237.50, she was almost thirteen points clear of the rest of the field after the competition, taking home her first World title in a dominant fashion. The silver medal was awarded to Zagitova's current training mate Elizabet Tursynbayeva, and Medvedeva took the bronze medal.

2019–20 season: Struggles

Zagitova began the 2019–20 season at the Japan Open where she placed second with a score of 154.41, behind her team and training mate Alexandra Trusova, contributing to Team Europe's win.

Beginning the Grand Prix at the 2019 Internationaux de France, Zagitova placed second in the short program behind training mate Alena Kostornaia, after receiving an edge call on her triple lutz and under-rotating the triple loop in combination with it. In the free skate, she botched an opening triple lutz jump and under-rotated three others, placing third in that segment behind Kostornaia and Mariah Bell. She took the silver medal overall, and deemed the performance as having "room to grow." At the 2019 NHK Trophy, she placed fourth in the short program with a score of 66.84 after landing an invalid single loop in her combination jump with triple flip after failing to attach the planned triple loop to her Lutz. In the free, she skated much better to earn a score of 151.15, for a third-place finish overall, behind Kostornaia and Kihira.  All three of the podium finishers qualified to the Grand Prix Final.

Competing at the Grand Prix Final, Zagitova skated cleanly and placed second in the short program, behind only Kostornaia, aided by triple Axel errors by both Kihira and Trusova. She was less successful in the free skate, falling on a double Axel and having several other jumps deemed underrotated or downgraded, and finished sixth in that segment and overall.

Zagitova suspended her season following the Grand Prix Final, stating that she no longer had motivation to compete. She withdrew from the 2020 Russian Championships and thus, did not contend for berths on the 2020 European Championships. She did not intend to compete in the 2020 World Championships either prior to its cancellation. However, she remained the reigning world champion as a result of the cancellation of the 2020 World Championships until the 2021 World Figure Skating Championships. As of October 2020, Zagitova extended her break from competitive figure skating until 2021 at earliest. On 14 May 2021 the Russian press reported the announcement that Zagitova would not be representing Russia on the national team during the 2021–2022 season stating: "Olympic champion Alina Zagitova and two-time world champion Evgenia Medvedeva have not been included in the Russian Figure Skating Federation's (RFSF) national team for the 2021-2022, putting their hopes of competing at the Beijing 2022 Winter Olympic Games at risk."

Skating technique 
Zagitova is known for her signature triple lutz-triple loop combination, and has also executed other triple loop combinations such as the triple flip-triple loop. She also performs other combinations, such as triple lutz-triple toe, double axel-triple toe, and the triple flip-double toe-double loop in competitions. She regularly employs the "Rippon" variation, with both arms over the head when jumping.

In addition, Zagitova is also the only female senior skater in history to have executed two fully back-loaded programs in the 2017–18 season, prior to the implementation of the eponymous "Zagitova Rule".

Public image 
Zagitova was awarded the Order of Friendship by Vladimir Putin for her Olympic win at the 2018 Winter Olympics. She is also a two-time winner of the Silver Doe Prize, awarded by the Federation of Sports Journalists of Russia, as one of the ten best athletes of 2017 and 2018. She was named female "Athlete of the Year" in the nomination "Pride of Russia" by the Ministry of Sport of Russia in 2018, leaving behind fencer Inna Deriglazova and gymnast Angelina Melnikova.  Forbes Russia's Top 30 Under 30 list named Zagitova as the top athlete in the sports category. Zagitova is also part of the list of Top 40 most successful Russians from sport and show business under the age of 40. She was named "Sportswoman of the Year" at the 2019 Glamour Russia Awards and "People's Sportsman" (as determined by VTsIOM) at the Sovetsky Sport – Year-in-review ceremony of the same year. Zagitova opted out of the 2020 Russian Test Skates, stating she was wanting to focus on her new role as the host of a Russian reality TV show, Ice Age.

Endorsements 
Zagitova has endorsed numerous brands over the years. She is currently the ambassador for sports brand Puma. She has also advertised for Shiseido, Sberbank of Russia, smartphone game Madoka Magica, and PepsiCo's brand of flavored water "Aqua Minerale Active". Zagitova appeared on the front cover of the May 2020 issue of Cosmopolitan Russia.

Early and personal life

Zagitova was born on 18 May 2002 in Izhevsk, Udmurtia. She is the daughter of Leysan Zagitova and Ilnaz Zagitov (ru), an ice hockey coach from Tatarstan, both of them are Volga Tatars. She has a sister, Sabina, who is five years younger than her. She was nameless for a year until her parents decided to name her "Alina" after watching Russian rhythmic gymnast (and fellow Tatar) Alina Kabaeva. She moved to Moscow at age 13 alongside her grandmother, and continues to live with her. Throughout childhood, her hobby was drawing. In an interview with Margarita Mamun, Zagitova indicated that she is apparently a lover of pet animals keeping two exotic chinchillas at her home in Moscow, along with a dog and a cat. She also owns an Akita Inu dog named Masaru, given to her by a Japanese breeder as a gift after the Pyeongchang Olympics. Zagitova identifies as a Muslim.

In June 2020, Zagitova passed the Unified State Exam (USE) and later in August it was announced that she'd entered the Russian Presidential Academy of National Economy and Public Administration (RANEPA) to pursue a degree in journalism.

World records

World record scores 

Zagitova has set the world record scores 4 times under the +5 / -5 GOE (Grade of Execution) system.

Historical world record scores 
Note: Because of the introduction of the new +5 / -5 GOE (Grade of Execution) system which replaced the previous +3 / -3 GOE system, ISU has decided that all statistics starts from zero starting from season 2018–19 and all previous statistics are historical.

Zagitova had set one senior world record score and five junior world record scores before season 2018–19.

Programs

Post-2020

Pre-2020

Competitive highlights

 GP: Grand Prix; CS: Challenger Series; JGP: Junior Grand Prix

Detailed results

Senior level

Small medals for short program and free skating awarded only at ISU Championships. At team events, medals awarded for team results only. Previous ISU world best highlighted in bold. Historical ISU world best highlighted in bold with a * mark. Personal bests highlighted in italic.

Junior level

Small medals for short program and free skating awarded only at ISU Championships. Previous ISU world bests highlighted in bold.

References

External links

 
 

! colspan="3" style="border-top: 5px solid #78FF78;" |World Record Holders

! colspan="3" style="border-top: 5px solid #78FF78;" |Historical World Record Holders (before season 2018–19)

! colspan="3" style="border-top: 5px solid #78FF78;" |Historical World Junior Record Holders (before season 2018–19)

2002 births
Living people
Russian female single skaters
Figure skaters at the 2018 Winter Olympics
Olympic figure skaters of Russia
Medalists at the 2018 Winter Olympics
Olympic medalists in figure skating
Olympic gold medalists for Olympic Athletes from Russia
Olympic silver medalists for Olympic Athletes from Russia
World Figure Skating Championships medalists
European Figure Skating Championships medalists
World Junior Figure Skating Championships medalists
Season's world number one figure skaters
Sportspeople from Izhevsk
Tatar people of Russia
Volga Tatar people
Tatar sportspeople
Russian Muslims